Fredderick Edmund VanVleet Sr. (born February 25, 1994) is an American professional basketball player for the Toronto Raptors of the National Basketball Association (NBA).

A point guard, VanVleet played college basketball for Wichita State University before beginning his NBA career. He contributed to a resurgence of Wichita State Shockers basketball that included a Final Four run by the 2012–13 Shockers team and an undefeated regular season by the 2013–14 team. VanVleet was named as a 2014 NCAA Men's Basketball All-American by a variety of media outlets. As a junior for the 2014–15 Shockers, he was an All-Missouri Valley Conference first team selection and received All-American honorable mention recognition from the Associated Press. VanVleet is the Wichita State career assists leader and was named Missouri Valley Conference Men's Basketball Player of the Year as both a sophomore and a senior.

After going undrafted in the 2016 NBA Draft, VanVleet signed with the Toronto Raptors. He spent time with the Raptors and with their G League affiliate, Raptors 905, during the 2016–17 season; he was a member of Raptors 905's 2017 championship team. VanVleet went on to become a key player for the Raptors and won an NBA championship with the team in 2019. He owns the single game points record not only for the Raptors, but also for any undrafted NBA player, when he scored 54 against Orlando in 2021. VanVleet was named to his first NBA All-Star Game in 2022.

High school career
VanVleet played for Auburn High School in Rockford, Illinois, where he was an All-State first team selection by the Chicago Sun-Times (Class 4A), Associated Press (Class 4A), and Chicago Tribune as a senior in 2012. In 2012, VanVleet helped lead Auburn to a 22-game winning streak which resulted in the school's first Illinois High School Association (IHSA) final four since 1975. He led the Knights to a 3rd-place finish in the IHSA state tournament.

VanVleet remained loyal to his local Rockford Amateur Athletic Union (AAU) club team rather than accept offers to more high-profile teams in Chicago. VanVleet did not feel it would make a difference in his recruiting: "As long as you're leading whoever you're playing with, the coaches are going to see that. If they see you competing and winning with guys maybe I shouldn't be winning with, that's maybe even an advantage for me." He received basketball scholarship offers from Colorado State, Northern Illinois, Wichita State,  Southern Illinois, Drake, Detroit, and Kent State. His stepfather felt that he was being overlooked by many Chicago metropolitan area schools because of his decision not to join a Chicago AAU team. He cut his list down to Kent State, Northern Illinois, and Wichita State. When he accepted an offer to play for Wichita State, he became the only member of the national class of 2012 Rivals.com top 150 to attend a Missouri Valley Conference school.

College career

Freshman year

As a freshman, VanVleet contributed double digit scoring twice (versus Gonzaga and Ohio State) in the 2013 NCAA Men's Division I Basketball Tournament from off the bench as the 2012–13 Shockers team reached the final four. Against Gonzaga, his 13 points included a basket with 1:28 remaining that helped the Shockers secure only the fifth sweet sixteen appearance by a number 9 seed since the tournament went to 64 teams in 1985. His 12 points against Ohio State included a late basket that helped the Shockers become the fifth team with a seeding higher than eight to make it to the final four since 1979 when seeding began.

Sophomore year
VanVleet broke out as a sophomore, as expected. On January 23, 2014, he was selected to the 23-man Oscar Robertson Award midseason watchlist by the United States Basketball Writers Association.  On February 17, Vanvleet was selected as one of 23 finalists for the Bob Cousy Award. When the Rockford native returned to the Chicago metropolitan area on February 19 to lead Wichita State against Loyola, he went 6-for-6 from the field and 10-for-10 on his free throw attempts for a game-high 22 points and added 8 rebounds and 6 assists to help Wichita State raise its record to 28–0. The 28–0 Shockers (Cleanthony Early, Tekele Cotton, VanVleet, Ron Baker and Chadrack Lufile) appeared on the cover of the February 24, 2014 Sports Illustrated. On February 28, he was named one of the 10 semi-finalists for the Naismith Award.

VanVleet helped lead the 2013–14 team to the first 31–0 regular season in NCAA Division I men's basketball history. As a result, he was named to the Missouri Valley Conference All-Conference first team and selected as the Missouri Valley Conference Men's Basketball Player of the Year. He was also selected to the 2014 Missouri Valley Conference Most-Improved Team. Following the 2014 Missouri Valley Conference men's basketball tournament, VanVleet was a 2014 NCAA Men's Basketball All-American second team selection by Sports Illustrated and Bleacher Report, third-team selection by the Sporting News and the NABC. He earned honorable mention recognition from the Associated Press. On March 11 VanVleet was named to the all-District VI (IA, MO, KS, OK, NE, ND, SD) team by the United States Basketball Writers Association (USBWA). VanVleet was listed on the National Association of Basketball Coaches Division I All‐District 16 first team on March 12. VanVleet was named as one of six finalists for the Cousy Award (along with Kyle Anderson, Aaron Craft, Tyler Ennis, Shabazz Napier, and Marcus Paige). For the season, he led the Missouri Valley Conference in assists per game (5.36). Following his sophomore season, he delivered the commencement address at his high school alma mater and became a highly demanded public speaker.

Junior year

VanVleet was Preseason All-American first team selection by USA Today, Blue Ribbon College Basketball Yearbook, Bleacher Report, CBSSports.com, Sports Illustrated, and Associated Press. He was a second team selection by Athlon Sports, SB Nation, and NBCSports.com. In its preseason top 100 player ranking, VanVleet was listed at number 5 by ESPN. VanVleet was named to the 36-man Bob Cousy Award Preseason Watch List. He was also listed as a John R. Wooden Award Preseason Top 50 candidate and an Oscar Robertson Trophy Watch List selection. VanVleet was also included in the early December Naismith Award top 50 watch list.

On November 14, VanVleet tallied 7 steals in the opener against New Mexico State, which tied a school record. On December 3, against #25 Utah VanVleet, helped Wichita State recover from a 9-point deficit in the final 2:45 of regulation with 8 points (including two three-point shots in the final 1:15) and an assist on a three-point shot, but with 7 seconds remaining in overtime and Wichita trailing by one, he missed the front end of a one and one. In his return visit to Chicago and the Gentile Center to play Loyola on January 11, he again was perfect from the field with a 5-for-5 performance and added a career-high tying 10 assists (as well as 6 rebounds and 3 steals) for his first career double-double. VanVleet, however, snapped his perfect streak of 20 free throws made in his home state with a 3-for-4 performance. In the rematch against Loyola on January 28, VanVleet posted a career-high 27 points. On February 7, VanVleet posted the first triple double for Wichita State Shockers men's basketball in 43 years with a 10-point 10-rebound 11-assist 4-steal performance against Missouri State. On February 16, VanVleet was Missouri Valley Conference Co-Player of the Week (with Seth Tuttle). On February 26, VanVleet broke the all-time Wichita State career assist record against Evansville with 431 assists, surpassing Warren Jabali who had 429 and Toure Murry who had 430. VanVleet was one of 17 finalists for the Cousy Award. The Shockers defeated Northern Iowa on February 28 to win the Missouri Valley Conference regular season title. In the opening game of the 2015 NCAA Men's Division I Basketball Tournament for the Shockers, VanVleet matched a career high with 27 points against Indiana. He finished the tournament with 17-point and 25-point performances against #2-seeded Kansas and #3-seeded Notre Dame, respectively. For the season, he repeated as the Missouri Valley Conference in assists per game (5.23) leader.

VanVleet was named an All-MVC first team selection following the regular season. He was also recognized by the Associated Press as an honorable mention selection for its All-America team.

Senior year
VanVleet was a selection to the 20-man Bob Cousy Award preseason watchlist, and the 30-man Lute Olson Award preseason watchlist. He was a second team selection to the Sporting News, Sports Illustrated and Athlon Sports preseason All-American teams. He was a third team selection to the CBS Sports, USA Today and NBC Sports preseason All-American teams. Lindy's Sports did not name an All-America team, but did rank all college basketball players by position and presented a top 25 list at each position. It included VanVleet as its second best point guard. In preseason top 100 player rankings, VanVleet was ranked 14 by ESPN and 17 by NBC Sports. He made the initial 50-man John R. Wooden Award watch list on November 17. On December 2, VanVleet earned recognition on the 50-man Naismith College Player of the Year watchlist and 33-man Robertson Trophy watchlists.

VanVleet had been dealing with hamstring issues when he rolled his right ankle, because of this he saw no more than three minutes of playing time in the season opener against the Charleston Southern Buccaneers on November 13. Though he played in the next game against Tulsa, it aggravated his hamstring enough that he was expected to miss the following few games. Without a healthy VanVleet, Wichita State fell to two games under .500 for the first time since its 2008–09 team as well as endured, not only its first three-game losing streak since having VanVleet come off the bench for the 2012–13 team, but also its worst start to a season (2–4) since the 2007–08 team. VanVleet returned to the lineup on December 5 against St. Louis to bring the consecutive losses to an end. For having averages of 13.5 points, 5.0 assists, and 4.0 rebounds in two significant wins in December, one on the 9th over UNLV and another on the 12th over #25 Utah, VanVleet claimed Missouri Valley Player of the Week honors on the 14th of that month. He earned Player of the Week honors again on January 11 after he led the Shockers to victories over conference co-leaders Evansville and Southern Illinois on January 6 and 9 respectively, with his 11.0 points, 8.5 rebounds, 7.5 assists, and 2.5 steals averages. His 12 rebounds against Southern Illinois was a career high.  VanVleet was named to the January 25, 20-man Oscar Robertson Trophy midseason watch list. On January 31, VanVleet made all 15 of his free throw attempts on his way to a career high 32 points against Evansville. The following day, he earned his third MVC Player of the Week honor. On February 3 in the 1500th victory in Wichita State Shockers men's basketball history and in head coach Gregg Marshall's school record-setting 221st victory, VanVleet notched a double-double with 12 points and a career high-tying 11 assists against Southern Illinois. He was named to the 35-man midseason watchlist for the Naismith Trophy on February 11. VanVleet was included in the Wooden Award Late season Top 20 Watch List on February 12. In the 2016 NCAA Men's Division I Basketball Tournament, VanVleet led the team to victories over Vanderbilt and Arizona. Against Vanderbilt in the First Four round, he and fellow senior Ron Baker led an 11–0 run to break a 30–30 tie on March 15. The pair scored all 11 points in the run and tied with a game-high 14 points. On March 17, VanVleet and Baker led 11-seed Wichita State to a victory over 6-seed and AP Poll 17th-ranked Arizona. VanVleet posted a game-high 16 points, 5 steals, and 4 rebounds. With four steals in his final career game on March 19 against Miami, VanVleet brought his career total to 225, setting a school career record. For the season, he repeated as the Missouri Valley Conference in assists per game (5.55) leader for a third time and led the conference in free throw percentage (81.7%).

Following the regular season, VanVleet was named to the Missouri Valley Conference all-league first team (for the third consecutive season) and the MVC Larry Bird Trophy Player of the Year for the second time in three years. VanVleet was also an AP All-America honorable mention.

Professional career

Toronto Raptors (2016–present)

Early years (2016–2018) 
VanVleet was not selected in the 2016 NBA draft after declining two offers to agree to play in the NBA Development League at annual salaries of $20,000 for two years by teams interested in drafting him in the second round. VanVleet signed to play in the 2016 NBA Summer League with the Toronto Raptors with the expectation that he would be in the Raptors' training camp. His summer league contract had a guarantee of three game appearances. On July 18, he signed a multi-year deal with the Raptors. At the time of his signing, the Raptors had 14 players entering training camp on guaranteed contracts, including point guards Kyle Lowry, Cory Joseph, and Delon Wright. VanVleet was competing with Brady Heslip, Drew Crawford, Yanick Moreira, E. J. Singler and Jarrod Uthoff for the final spot. On October 22, VanVleet remained on the roster when the team cut down to 15 players.

VanVleet made his official league debut on November 9, 2016, playing in only 26 seconds in a 112–102 win against the Oklahoma City Thunder. VanVleet posted his first two points in the Raptors' 19th game and his fourth appearance, which came against the Los Angeles Lakers on December 2. With Lowry sidelined for a night, VanVleet played with the second unit and posted career-highs with 25 minutes and 10 points on January 17 against the Brooklyn Nets. On February 3, VanVleet established a new career high with 15 points in a 102–94 loss to the Orlando Magic. During his rookie season, VanVleet had multiple assignments with Raptors 905 of the NBA Development League. He was a member of Raptors 905's championship-winning team in April 2017.

On November 25, 2017, VanVleet posted a career-high 16 points against the Indiana Pacers. Four days later, he had a career-high nine assists in a 126–113 win over the Charlotte Hornets. VanVleet posted new career-highs in points two times during January 2018: first on the 11th against the Cleveland Cavaliers with 22, then on the 28th against the Los Angeles Lakers with 25. On March 7, VanVleet made a long jump shot from the left corner with 1.1 seconds left to break a tie and clinch a 121–119 overtime win for the Raptors over the Pistons, as well as help Toronto to become the first team to clinch a berth in the 2018 NBA Playoffs. VanVleet finished the 2017–2018 season averaging 8.6 points, 3.2 assists, and 2.4 rebounds in 76 games; he ranked 4th in the NBA in net efficiency per possession behind Stephen Curry, Eric Gordon, and Chris Paul and was the only full-time bench player in the top 20 (19th) in the league for plus-minus. He was subsequently nominated for the NBA Sixth Man of the Year Award.

Championship season (2018–2019) 
VanVleet re-signed with the Raptors on July 6, 2018. He scored a season-high 19 points on December 9, 2018, in a 104–99 loss to the Milwaukee Bucks. Two days later, he had a career-high 14 assists in a 123–99 win over the Los Angeles Clippers. On December 19, he made a go-ahead three-point shot, with 25 seconds remaining, to cap a 17-point comeback against the Indiana Pacers. On January 5, he had a season high-tying 21 points in a 123–116 win over the Bucks. On February 7, he set a new career high with 30 points in a 119–101 win over the Atlanta Hawks. He was ruled out for approximately three weeks in early February with a partial ligament injury to his left thumb, an injury that occurred two nights earlier against the New York Knicks.

The Raptors entered the 2019 NBA playoffs as the number two seed, where VanVleet was an important bench player for the team. After an early post-season shooting slump,
in Game 5 of the Eastern Conference Finals against the Bucks, VanVleet scored 21 points on seven 3-pointers in a 105–99 win, helping the Raptors take a 3–2 series lead. In Game 6, VanVleet scored 14 points in a 100–94 series-clinching win over the Bucks, helping the Raptors advance to the NBA Finals for the first time in franchise history. VanVleet played an important defensive role against Stephen Curry during the NBA Finals that saw him utilized in a box-and-one defense. In Game 6 of the NBA Finals, VanVleet scored a playoff career-high 22 points with five 3-pointers off the bench in a 114–110 series-clinching win, thus helping the Raptors win their first NBA championship in franchise history. VanVleet came second place in NBA Finals MVP voting to Kawhi Leonard.

Full-time starter (2019–2021) 
In the season-opener on October 22 against the New Orleans Pelicans, VanVleet scored a career high 34 points after receiving his first NBA championship ring. On January 4, 2020, he posted 29 points, including 22 in the second half, and a season-high 11 assists, keying a 16-point comeback win over the Brooklyn Nets. In the Raptors’ second game returning from the suspension of the season due to the COVID-19 pandemic on August 3, VanVleet scored a career-high 36 points, hitting 7 three-pointers, in a 107–103 win over the Miami Heat in the Orlando bubble. On August 17, VanVleet set a trio of playoff career-highs in points (30), three-pointers made (8), and assists (11) in a 134–110 win over the Brooklyn Nets in Game 1 of the Eastern Conference quarter finals in the 2020 NBA Playoff Bubble. VanVleet became the first Raptors player to record 30 points & 10+ assists in a playoff game, while also joining Damian Lillard, Stephen Curry, and Chris Paul as the only NBA players to record 30+ points, 10+ assists, and 8+ three pointers in a playoff game.

In November 2020, it was announced that VanVleet would remain with the Raptors with a four-year, US$85-million deal. The $85 million contract was the largest ever for an undrafted free agent until Duncan Robinson signed a 5-year $90 million deal the following year. On January 4, 2021, VanVleet scored a season-high 35 points, hitting six three-pointers in a 126–114 loss to the Boston Celtics. On January 6, 2021, VanVleet set a new franchise record with a made three-pointer in 39 straight regular season games, beating the previous record that was set by C. J. Miles with 38. On February 2, VanVleet scored a career-high 54 points, hitting a career-high 11 three-pointers in a 123–108 win against the Orlando Magic. VanVleet set a franchise record for the most points scored in a game, surpassing DeMar DeRozan's previous record, while also making history for the most points scored by an undrafted NBA player, previously held by Moses Malone with 53. VanVleet also set a franchise record for most three-pointers in the first half, with eight. On April 2, VanVleet extended his consecutive regular season games streak with a made 3-point shot to 76 and left the game against the Golden State Warriors due to a hip flexor injury.  On April 8, VanVleet was suspended for one game for leaving the bench during an altercation between the Raptors and the Los Angeles Lakers. When VanVleet returned from his 6-game injury and 1-game suspension, he was held to six points (0 for 6 on three point shots) by the Orlando Magic ending the streak. The streak included VanVleet appearances 23–54 (32 games) of the 2019-20 regular season for the 2019-20 Toronto Raptors and appearances 1–44 (44 games) of the 2020-21 regular season for the 2020-21 Toronto Raptors. This excludes the 11 games of the 2020 NBA playoffs in which VanVleet also converted 3-point shots.

First All-Star selection (2021–present) 
On November 18 against the Utah Jazz, VanVleet extended his streak of consecutive games with at least three 3-point shots made to 8 by making 3-point shots on three consecutive possessions. The streak ended the following night against Sacramento when he only made two. On December 31, 2021, January 2, and January 4, 2022, VanVleet scored 31, 35 and 33 points against the Los Angeles Clippers, New York Knicks and San Antonio Spurs, respectively. This made VanVleet the fourth undrafted player (along with Moses Malone, Mike James and Connie Hawkins) to score 30 or more points in 3 consecutive games. On January 7, 2022, VanVleet recorded his first career triple-double with 37 points, 10 rebounds and 10 assists, including 24 points in the third quarter alone, leading Toronto to a 122–108 comeback victory over the Utah Jazz. During the third quarter performance, VanVleet singlehandedly erased a 14-point deficit by scoring 15 unanswered points in a 2-minute and 27 second span. For week 12 (January 3–9) of the 2021-22 NBA season VanVleet was named NBA Eastern Conference Player of the Week for the first time on January 10 for leading the Raptors to a 4–0 record with a 30.3 points, 6.5 assists, 4.8 rebounds, 2.0 steals and 36.5 minutes per game averages. On February 3, VanVleet was named an NBA All-Star for the first time in his career, becoming just the fourth undrafted (modern era) player to make an all-star team, joining John Starks (1994), Ben Wallace (2003–06) and Brad Miller (2003–04), (fifth or sixth if you count Connie Hawkins and/or Moses Malone who were draft eligible when competing leagues existed but were never drafted in the NBA draft). On April 3, 2022, VanVleet broke Kyle Lowry's Raptors record for most 3-pointers in a season (238) vs. the Miami Heat while playing against Lowry as he was on the court. VanVleet finished the season with 242 in 65 games played. VanVleet (37.88) finished just behind teammate Pascal Siakam (37.91) for the leadership in minutes played per game over the course of the season. VanVleet suffered a hip flexor injury during game 4 of the first round of the 2022 NBA playoffs against the Philadelphia 76ers and the Raptors were eliminated in 6 games.

Career statistics

NBA

Regular season

|-
| style="text-align:left;"|
| style="text-align:left;"|Toronto
| 37 || 0 || 7.9 || .351 || .379 || .818 || 1.1 || .9 || .4 || .1 || 2.9
|-
| style="text-align:left;"|
| style="text-align:left;"|Toronto
| 76 || 0 || 20.0 || .426 || .414 || .832 || 2.4 || 3.2 || .9 || .3 || 8.6
|-
| style="text-align:left; background:#afe6ba;"|
| style="text-align:left;"|Toronto
| 64 || 28 || 27.5 || .410 || .378 || .843 || 2.6 || 4.8 || .9 || .3 || 11.0
|-
| style="text-align:left;"|
| style="text-align:left;"|Toronto
| 54 || 54 || 35.7 || .418 || .392 || .848 || 3.9 || 6.6 || 1.9 || .3 || 17.6
|-
| style="text-align:left;"|
| style="text-align:left;"|Toronto
| 52 || 52 || 36.5 || .389 || .366 || .885 || 4.2 || 6.3 || 1.7 || .7 || 19.6
|-
| style="text-align:left;"|
| style="text-align:left;"|Toronto
| 65 || 65 || 37.9 || .403 || .377 || .874 || 4.4 || 6.7 || 1.7 || .5 || 20.3
|- class="sortbottom"
| style="text-align:center;" colspan="2"|Career
| 348 || 199 || 28.3 || .404 || .382 || .860 || 3.2 || 4.9 || 1.3 || .4 || 13.7
|- class="sortbottom"
| style="text-align:center;" colspan="2"|All-Star
| 1 || 0 || 9.0 || .500 || .500 ||  || 2.0 || 3.0 || .0 || .0 || 6.0

Playoffs

|-
| style="text-align:left;"|2017
| style="text-align:left;"|Toronto
| 7 || 0 || 4.1 || .667 || .400 || – || .1 || .6 || .1 || .0 || 2.0
|-
| style="text-align:left;"|2018
| style="text-align:left;"|Toronto
| 6 || 1 || 19.0 || .333 || .286 || .875 || 1.7 || 2.2 || .0 || .0 || 6.8
|-
| style="text-align:left; background:#afe6ba;"|2019
| style="text-align:left;"|Toronto
| 24 || 0 || 24.7 || .392 || .388 || .774 || 1.8 || 2.6 || .8 || .3 || 8.0
|-
| style="text-align:left;"|2020
| style="text-align:left;"|Toronto
| 11 || 11 || 39.1 || .400 || .391 || .840 || 4.4 || 6.9 || 1.6 || .6 || 19.6
|-
| style="text-align:left;"|2022
| style="text-align:left;"|Toronto
| 4 || 4 || 35.0 || .352 || .333 || .833 || 3.0 || 6.3 || 1.8 || 1.0 || 13.8
|- class="sortbottom"
| style="text-align:center;" colspan="2"|Career
| 52 || 16 || 25.1 || .391 || .372 || .814 || 2.2 || 3.5 || .8 || .3 || 10.0

College

|-
| style="text-align:left;"|2012–13
| style="text-align:left;"|Wichita State
| 39 || 0 || 16.2 || .386 || .408 || .725 || 1.8 || 2.3 || .9 || .1 || 4.3
|-
| style="text-align:left;"|2013–14
| style="text-align:left;"|Wichita State
| 36 || 36 || 31.7 || .484 || .418 || .830 || 3.9 || 5.4 || 1.9 || .1 || 11.6
|-
| style="text-align:left;"|2014–15
| style="text-align:left;"|Wichita State
| 35 || 35 || 31.5 || .430 || .357 || .796 || 4.5 || 5.2 || 1.9 || .1 || 13.6
|-
| style="text-align:left;"|2015–16
| style="text-align:left;"|Wichita State
| 31 || 31 || 29.0 || .390 || .381 || .817 || 3.2 || 5.5 || 1.8 || .1 || 12.2
|- class="sortbottom"
| style="text-align:center;" colspan="2"|Career
| 141 || 102 || 26.8 || .426 || .386 || .805 || 3.3 || 4.5 || 1.6 || .1 || 10.2

Records
NBA
Single-game points by an undrafted player (54)

Raptors
Single-game points (54)
Single season three-point shots made (242)
Single half three-point shots made (8)
Consecutive regular season games within a single season with three-point shot made (44)
Consecutive regular season games to start a season with three-point shot made (44)
Consecutive regular season games with three-point shot made (76)
Consecutive regular season and playoff games with three-point shot made (87)

Missouri Valley Conference
Single-MVC tournament three-point shots made without a miss (3, tied)

Wichita
Career steals (225)
Career assists (637)
Career assist:turnover ratio (3.08)
Career games played (141)
Single-game steals (7, tied)
Single-game free throws made without a miss (15, tied)
Junior season steals (66)
Sophomore season steals (69)
Sophomore season steals/game (1.92)
Sophomore season minutes played (1141)
Single NCAA tournament game steals (5)
Single NCAA tournament steals (11)
Single NCAA tournament assists (35)
Career NCAA tournament steals (26)
Career NCAA tournament games played (13, tied)
Career NCAA tournament free throws made/attempted (48/57)
Career NCAA tournament assists (51)

National team career
VanVleet was among the 22 players selected to try out for the 12-man Team USA at the 2015 Pan American Games. He was among the 16 finalists for the team, but he did not make the final 12-man team.

Personal life
Fred VanVleet is the son of Fred Manning, who was killed in 1999. Manning had played basketball at Guilford High School in Rockford. VanVleet's mother is named Susan, and his stepfather is Joe Danforth. VanVleet is biracial; his father was black and his mother is white. He has a daughter who was born on January 29, 2018. On May 20, 2019, his son was born during the Raptors Eastern Conference Finals series against the Milwaukee Bucks. He also has a brother named Darnell.

VanVleet was a sociology major at Wichita State.

Podcast
In conjunction with Acast, VanVleet launched the "Bet On Yourself" podcast, premiering on Wednesday, Nov. 3. Season 1 of the podcast was advertised to "feature conversations about perseverance, struggles, and success with up-and-coming Black Indigenous, People of Color (BIPOC) entrepreneurs in Canada,"

See also
Toronto Raptors accomplishments and records

References

External links

 Wichita State Shockers bio
 stats at ESPN

1994 births
Living people
African-American basketball players
All-American college men's basketball players
American expatriate basketball people in Canada
American men's basketball players
Basketball players from Illinois
Point guards
Raptors 905 players
Sportspeople from Rockford, Illinois
Toronto Raptors players
Undrafted National Basketball Association players
Wichita State Shockers men's basketball players